The Capsalidae is a family of monopisthocotylean monogeneans, which includes about 200 species.

The monophyly of the Capsalidae is supported by possession of accessory sclerites in the haptor (the posterior attachment organ), and was confirmed by molecular phylogeny. Their oncomiracidium (the free larva) is distinct from that of other families.

Capsalids are parasite on various organs of marine fish (teleosts and elasmobranchs), including skin, fins and gills. Several capsalid species, such a Neobenedenia spp. are pathogenic, especially on maricultured fish.

Included Genera
Genera as recognized in WorMs are listed below. Recent molecular analyses have shown that several genera, which were defined on morphological characters, are not monophyletic.

Menziesia and Nitzschia have their equivalent in the botanical nomenclature: Menziesia (a flowering plant) and Nitzschia (a diatom).

 Allobenedenia Yamaguti, 1963
 Alloencotyllabe Khalil & Abdul-Salam, 1988
 Allomegalocotyla Yamaguti, 1963
 Allometabenedeniella Velasquez, 1982
 Ancyrocotyle Parona & Monticelli, 1903
 Benedenia Diesing, 1858
 Benedeniella Johnston, 1929
 Branchobdella Kearn, Whittington & Evans-Gowing, 2007
 Calicobenedenia Kritsky & Fennessy, 1999
 Capsala Bosc, 1811
 Capsaloides Price, 1936
 Dioncopseudobenedenia Yamaguti, 1965
 Encotyllabe Diesing, 1850
 Entobdella Blainville in Lamarck, 1818
 Interniloculus Suriano & Beverley-Burton, 1979
 Lagenivaginopseudobenedenia Yamaguti, 1966
 Listrocephalos Bullard, Payne & Braswell, 2004
 Macrophyllida Johnston, 1929
 Mediavagina Lawler & Hargis, 1968
 Megalobenedenia Egorova, 1994
 Megalocotyle Folda, 1928
 Menziesia Gibson, 1976
 Metabenedeniella Yamaguti, 1958
 Nasicola Yamaguti, 1968
 Neobenedenia Yamaguti, 1963
 Neobenedeniella Yamaguti, 1963
 Neoentobdella Kearn & Whittington, 2005
 Nitzschia Baer, 1826
 Oligoncobenedenia Yamaguti, 1965
 Pseudoallobenedenia Yamaguti, 1966
 Pseudobenedenia Johnston, 1931
 Pseudobenedeniella Timofeeva, Gaevskaja & Kovaliova, 1987
 Pseudobenedenoides Szidat, 1969
 Pseudoentobdella Yamaguti, 1963
 Pseudomegalocotyla Yamaguti, 1963
 Pseudonitzschia Yamaguti, 1968
 Sessilorbis Mamaev, 1970
 Sprostonia Bychowsky, 1957
 Sprostoniella Bychowsky & Nagibina, 1967
 Tetrasepta Suriano, 1975
 Trilobiodiscus Bychowsky & Nagibina, 1967
 Trimusculotrema Whittington & Barton, 1990
 Tristoma Cuvier, 1817
 Tristomella Guiart, 1938
 Trochopella Euzet & Trilles, 1962
 Trochopus Diesing, 1850

References

External links

Monopisthocotylea
Platyhelminthes families